Amansio Andrei Paraschiv (born June 25, 1992) is a Romanian professional kickboxer and boxer. He won back to back gold medals in the WAKO European Championships, and is the current SUPERKOMBAT Middleweight Champion. Paraschiv became champion on 12 November 2016 after defeating former It's Showtime 69MAX champion and reigning title holder Chris Ngimbi.

Personal life
He is the son of former professional boxer, Gheorghe Paraschiv, a two-time Romanian champion in two weight divisions (featherweight and super featherweight). Paraschiv is married and has 2 daughters (b. 2015).

Career
He won the SUPERKOMBAT New Heroes Middleweight Championship in March 2015, with a unanimous decision win over Julian Imeri. Paraschiv had fought Cedric Manhoef for the same title a year before, but their fight ended in a draw.

Amansio fought Chris Ngimbi for the SUPERKOMBAT Middleweight title in November 2016. He had fought him just a month before for the vacant title, but lost by decision. He was more successful in the rematch, and defeated Ngimbi by unanimous decision.

Paraschiv was stopped for the only time ins his career in controversial circumstances to lose a lightweight bout against the defending champion Armen Petrosyan. Bellator booked a rematch after the stoppage at Bellator Kickboxing 8.

He defended his SUPERKOMBAT Middleweight title against Rosario Presti, during OSS Fighters 04. He successfully defended the title with a unanimous decision win.

On 15 October 2020, he signed with boxing's MTK Global.

Championships and accomplishments

Kickboxing
World Association of Kickboxing Organizations
 2022 WAKO-Pro Intercontinental Light Middleweight (-71.8 kg) Championship
 2012 WAKO European Championships in Bucharest, Romania Full-Contact Rules  −67.0 kg
 2012 WAKO European Championships in Ankara, Turkey K-1 Rules  −67.0 kg
Fight Clubbing Championship
 2022 Fight Clubbing World Middleweight Championship  
Golden Fighter Championship
 2021 GFC Intercontinental Light Middleweight (-71.0 kg) Championship 
World All Fight System Organization
 2017 AFSO Intercontinental Middleweight (-71.0 kg) Kickboxing Rules Championship
Superkombat Fighting Championship
2016 SUPERKOMBAT Middleweight (-72.5 kg) Championship
2015 SUPERKOMBAT New Heroes Middleweight (-71.0 kg) Championship 
2014 Rising Star
Kunlun Fight
2015 Kunlun Fight 16 Middleweight (-70.0 kg) Tournament Championship
World Kickboxing Network  
 2013 WKN Intercontinental Super Welterweight (-72.6 kg) Oriental Rules Championship
Local Kombat 
 2012 Local Kombat National -69.0 kg Championship

Boxing
Romanian Boxing Federation
2013 Romania National Boxing Championships  −69.0 kg

Professional kickboxing record

|- 
|-  bgcolor= 
| 2023-05-20 ||  ||align=left| Davide Armanini || Fight Clubbing 32 || Pescara, Italy ||  ||  || 
|-
! style=background:white colspan=9 |
|-  
|-  bgcolor="#CCFFCC" 
| 2022-12-17 || Win ||align=left| Ayoub Boukili || Fight Clubbing 30 || Chieti, Italy || Decision (unanimous) || 5 || 3:00 
|-
! style=background:white colspan=9 |
|-
|-  bgcolor="#CCFFCC" 
| 2022-09-10 || Win ||align=left|Sergio Sánchez || Best of the Best 1 || Brăila, Romania || Decision (split) || 5 || 3:00 
|-
! style=background:white colspan=9 |
|-
|-  bgcolor="#CCFFCC" 
| 2022-05-14 || Win ||align=left|Giuseppe Palermo || Fight Clubbing 29 || Pescara, Italy || TKO (doctor stoppage) || 3 || 1:32
|- 
|-  bgcolor="#FFBBBB"  
| 2021-11-12 || Loss ||align=left|Nordin Ben Moh || Enfusion 104 || Abu Dhabi, UAE || Decision (split) || 3 || 3:00   
|-
! style=background:white colspan=9 |
|- 
|-  bgcolor="#CCFFCC" 
| 2021-08-17 || Win ||align=left|Lofogo Sarour || KO Masters 9 || Bucharest, Romania || Decision (unanimous) || 3 || 3:00   
|- 
|-  bgcolor="#CCFFCC" 
| 2021-07-16 || Win ||align=left|Zahid Zairov || OSS Fighters 06 || Constanța, Romania || Decision (unanimous) || 3 || 3:00  
|-
|-  bgcolor="#CCFFCC"  
| 2021-06-24 || Win ||align=left|Christian Baya || GFC 7: Romania vs. Netherlands || Bucharest, Romania || Decision (split) || 3 || 3:00  
|-
! style=background:white colspan=9 |
|- 
|-  bgcolor="#FFBBBB"  
| 2020-02-22 || Loss ||align=left|Jonathan Mayezo || Stars Night 2020 || Vitrolles, France || Decision || 3 || 3:00 
|-
|-  bgcolor="#CCFFCC"  
| 2020-02-07 || Win ||align=left|Mohamed El-Mir || OSS Fighters 05 || Bucharest, Romania || Decision (unanimous) || 3 || 3:00   
|-
|-  bgcolor="#FFBBBB"  
| 2019-12-07 || Loss ||align=left|Akam Tarageh || Mix Fight Championship || Frankfurt, Germany || Decision (unanimous) || 3 || 3:00 
|-
|-  bgcolor="#CCFFCC"  
| 2019-08-22 || Win ||align=left|Rosario Presti || OSS Fighters 04 || Mamaia, Romania || Decision (unanimous) || 3 || 3:00   
|-
! style=background:white colspan=9 |
|-
|-  bgcolor="#FFBBBB"  
| 2019-06-13|| Loss ||align=left|Edye Ruiz || SAS Gym 02 || Bucharest, Romania || Decision (split) || 3 || 3:00
|-
|-  bgcolor="#CCFFCC"  
| 2019-02-28 || Win ||align=left|Cristian Milea || OSS Fighters 03 || Bucharest, Romania || Decision (unanimous) || 3 || 3:00   
|-
|-  bgcolor="#CCFFCC"  
| 2018-12-14 || Win ||align=left|Isteri Mitat || Dynamite Fighting Show 3 || Craiova, Romania || Decision (unanimous) || 3 || 3:00 
|-
|-  bgcolor="#FFBBBB"  
| 2018-10-27 || Loss ||align=left|Tayfun Özcan|| Enfusion 73 || Oberhausen, Germany || Decision (unanimous) || 3 || 3:00 
|-
|-  bgcolor="#CCFFCC"  
| 2018-10-08 || Win ||align=left|Ayoub Abdelkader || APP Fight Night 01 || Brașov, Romania || KO (liver knee) || 1 || 2:54 
|-
|-  bgcolor="#CCFFCC"  
| 2018-07-05 || Win ||align=left|Waldemar Nuriddinov || Dynamite Fighting Show 1 || Bucharest, Romania || TKO (doctor stoppage/spinning backfist) || 3 || 1:58
|-
|-  bgcolor="#CCFFCC"  
| 2018-05-24 || Win ||align=left|Otar Gogoberichvili || Colosseum Tournament 7 || Bucharest, Romania || Decision (unanimous) || 3 || 3:00 
|-
|-  bgcolor="#CCFFCC"  
| 2018-04-20 || Win ||align=left|Simon Mendès || Colosseum Tournament 6 || Iași, Romania || Decision (unanimous) || 3 || 3:00
|-
|-  bgcolor="#CCFFCC"  
| 2018-02-23 || Win ||align=left|Yuri Gentile || Colosseum Tournament 5 || Galați, Romania || Decision (unanimous) || 3 || 3:00
|-
|-  bgcolor="#FFBBBB"  
| 2017-12-09 || Loss ||align=left|Armen Petrosyan|| Bellator Kickboxing 8 at Bellator 190 || Florence, Italy || TKO (middle kick) || 1 || 2:12
|-
! style=background:white colspan=9 |
|-
|-  bgcolor="#CCFFCC"   
| 2017-10-16 || Win ||align=left|Ivan Naccari || Colosseum Tournament 4 || Bucharest, Romania || TKO (doctor stoppage) || 2 || 2:11 
|-
|-  bgcolor="#CCFFCC"  
| 2017-07-14 || Win ||align=left|Tim Müller || Colosseum Tournament 3: Romania vs. Germany || Mamaia, Romania || KO (right hook) || 3 || 2:58
|-
! style=background:white colspan=9 |
|-
|-  bgcolor="#CCFFCC"  
| 2017-06-17 || Win ||align=left|Jordan Valdinocci || Colosseum Tournament 2 || Ploiești, Romania || Decision (unanimous) || 3 || 3:00
|-
|-  bgcolor="#FFBBBB"  
| 2017-04-08 || Loss ||align=left|Giorgio Petrosyan  || Bellator Kickboxing 5 at Bellator 176 || Turin, Italy || Decision (unanimous) || 3 || 3:00 
|-  bgcolor="#CCFFCC"  
| 2016-11-12 || Win ||align=left|Chris Ngimbi  || SUPERKOMBAT World Grand Prix 2016 Final || Bucharest, Romania || Decision (unanimous) || 3 || 3:00
|-
! style=background:white colspan=9 |
|-
|-
|-  bgcolor="#FFBBBB"  
| 2016-10-01 || Loss ||align=left|Chris Ngimbi || SUPERKOMBAT World Grand Prix 2016 Final Elimination || Iași, Romania || Decision (unanimous) || 3 || 3:00
|-
! style=background:white colspan=9 |
|-
|-
|-  bgcolor="#CCFFCC"  
| 2016-07-30 || Win ||align=left|Rangel Ivanov || SUPERKOMBAT World Grand Prix III 2016 || Mamaia, Romania || TKO (doctor stoppage) || 1 || 2:50
|-
|-  bgcolor="#CCFFCC"  
| 2016-12-12 || Win ||align=left|Alkid Farruku || SUPERKOMBAT Special Edition Italy || Turin, Italy || KO (liver shot) || 1 || 2:02  
|-
|-  bgcolor="#CCFFCC"  
| 2016-06-25 || Win ||align=left|Anouar Lahmaj || SUPERKOMBAT New Heroes 9 || Brașov, Romania || Decision (majority) || 3 || 3:00
|-
|-  bgcolor="#CCFFCC"  
| 2016-05-07 || Win ||align=left|Cristian Milea || SUPERKOMBAT World Grand Prix II 2016 || Bucharest, Romania || Decision (split) || 3 || 3:00
|-
|-  bgcolor="#FFBBBB" 
| 2015-10-31 || Loss ||align=left|Zhang Chunyu || Kunlun Fight 33 || Changde, China || Decision (unanimous) || 3 || 3:00 
|-
! style=background:white colspan=9 |
|-
|-  bgcolor="#CCFFCC"  
| 2015-10-02 || Win ||align=left|Giannis Skordilis || SUPERKOMBAT World Grand Prix 2015 Final Elimination || Milan, Italy || Decision (unanimous) || 3 || 3:00
|-
|-  bgcolor="#CCFFCC" 
| 2015-05-23 || Win ||align=left|Hirachidine Saindou || SUPERKOMBAT World Grand Prix II 2015 || Bucharest, Romania || TKO (referee stoppage) || 1 || 1:59
|-
|-  bgcolor="#FFBBBB" 
| 2015-04-18 || Loss ||align=left|Elam Ngor || Enfusion #27 || Tenerife, Spain || Decision (unanimous) || 3 || 3:00
|-
|-  bgcolor="#CCFFCC" 
| 2015-03-07 || Win ||align=left|Julian Imeri || SUPERKOMBAT World Grand Prix I 2015 || Ploiești, Romania || Decision (unanimous) || 3 || 3:00
|-
! style=background:white colspan=9 |
|-
|-  bgcolor="#CCFFCC"
| 2015-02-01 || Win ||align=left|Liu Hainan ||Kunlun Fight 19 || Guangzhou, China || Decision || 3 || 3:00
|-
|-  bgcolor="#CCFFCC"
| 2015-01-04 || Win ||align=left|Kong Lingfeng || Kunlun Fight 16, Final || Nanjing, China || KO (jumping knee) || 2 || 2:59
|-
! style=background:white colspan=9 |
|-
|-  bgcolor= "#CCFFCC"
| 2015-01-04 || Win ||align=left|David Calvo || Kunlun Fight 16, Semi Finals || Nanjing, China || KO (right hook) || 2 || 1:31
|- 
|-  bgcolor= "#CCFFCC"
| 2014-11-22 || Win ||align=left|Riccardo Lecca || SUPERKOMBAT World Grand Prix 2014 Final || Monza, Italy || KO (left hook) || 1 || 1:50
|-  bgcolor="#FFBBBB" 
| 2014-10-04 || Loss ||align=left|Maxime Cerri || GBC: World Tour 7, Semi Finals || Mazan, France || Decision (majority) || 3 || 3:00  
|-  bgcolor="#CCFFCC"
| 2014-08-02 || Win ||align=left|Mădălin Crăciunică || SUPERKOMBAT New Heroes 8 || Constanța, Romania || Decision (unanimous) || 3 || 3:00 
|-  bgcolor="#CCFFCC"
| 2014-06-27 || Win ||align=left|Julien Souvenir || Battle of Saint-Raphaël II || Saint-Raphaël, France || Decision || 3 || 3:00
|-
! style=background:white colspan=9 |
|-
|-  bgcolor="#CCFFCC" 
| 2014-05-24 ||  Win ||align=left|Rangel Ivanov || SUPERKOMBAT World Grand Prix II 2014 || Mamaia, Romania || Decision (unanimous) || 3 || 3:00
|-  bgcolor="#c5d2ea" 
| 2014-03-29 || Draw ||align=left|Cedric Manhoef || SUPERKOMBAT New Heroes 7 || Ploiești, Romania || Draw (majority) || 3 || 3:00
|-
! style=background:white colspan=9 |
|-
|-  bgcolor="#CCFFCC" 
| 2013-11-24 || Win ||align=left|Lefterio Perego || La Nuit Des Titans XI || Charleroi, Belgium || Decision (unanimous) || 5 || 3:00
|-
! style=background:white colspan=9 |
|-
|-  bgcolor="#CCFFCC" 
| 2013-11-09 || Win ||align=left|Mohamed Ben Ali || SUPERKOMBAT World Grand Prix 2013 Final Elimination || Ploiești, Romania || TKO (retirement) || 1 || 3:00 
|-
! style=background:white colspan=9 |
|-
|-  bgcolor="#CCFFCC"
| 2013-10-12 || Win ||align=left|Alexandru Popescu || Golden League XVII || Bucharest, Romania || TKO (retirement) || 1 || 0:47
|-  bgcolor="#CCFFCC"
| 2013-05-11 || Win ||align=left|Angelo Wilkes || Enfusion Live: A1 World Combat Cup || Eindhoven, Netherlands || Decision (majority) || 3 || 3:00
|-  bgcolor="#CCFFCC"
| 2012-12-07 || Win ||align=left|Alin Șpan || Local Kombat Onești || Onești, Romania || TKO (doctor stoppage/cut) || 2 || 2:35
|-
! style=background:white colspan=9 |
|-
|-  bgcolor="#CCFFCC"
| 2012-09-22 || Win ||align=left|Marius Ciocîrlă || Călimăneşti Challenge || Călimănești, Romania || TKO || 2 || 1:21 
|-  bgcolor="#FFBBBB"
| 2012-05-04 || Loss ||align=left|Alin Șpan || Local Kombat Bodyguardul: Deva || Deva, Romania || Decision (split) || 3 || 3:00
|-  bgcolor="#CCFFCC"
| 2012-02-25 || Win ||align=left|Flavius Predoi || RXF 2 || Râmnicu Vâlcea, Romania || Decision || 3 || 3:00
|-
| colspan=9 | Legend:

Amateur kickboxing record

|-
|- bgcolor="#CCFFCC"
| 2012–12 || Win ||align=left| Oleg Zaytcev || 2012 WAKO European Full-Contact Championships, Final || Bucharest, Romania || Decision (unanimous) || 3
|-
! style=background:white colspan=7 | 
|-
|- bgcolor="#CCFFCC"
| 2012–12 || Win ||align=left| Vyacheslav Borshchev || 2012 WAKO European K-1 Championships, Final || Ankara, Turkey ||  || 
|-
! style=background:white colspan=7 | 
|-
|- bgcolor="#CCFFCC"
| 2012–11 || Win ||align=left| Piotr Kobylański || 2012 WAKO European K-1 Championships, Semi Finals ||  Ankara, Turkey || Decision (unanimous) || 3
|- bgcolor="#CCFFCC"
| 2012–11 || Win ||align=left| Pavel Filimonov || 2012 WAKO European K-1 Championships, Quarter Finals || Ankara, Turkey || Decision (unanimous) || 3
|-
| colspan=9 | Legend:

Professional boxing record

See also
List of male kickboxers

References

External links
Official DFS Profile

1992 births
Living people
Sportspeople from Ploiești
Romanian male kickboxers
Middleweight kickboxers
Romanian male boxers
Light-middleweight boxers
Kunlun Fight kickboxers
SUPERKOMBAT kickboxers
Romanian expatriate sportspeople in England